Ohangwena is one of the fourteen regions of Namibia, its capital is Eenhana. Major settlements in the region are the towns Eenhana and Helao Nafidi aa well as the self-governed village of Okongo. , Ohangwena had 150,724 registered voters.

Ohangwena is traversed by the northwesterly line of equal latitude and longitude. In the north, Ohangwena borders Angola: the Cunene Province, except for a small border with Cuando Cubango Province in the far northeast.  Domestically, it borders the following regions:
Kavango West - East
Oshikoto - South
Oshana - South West
Omusati - West

Economy and infrastructure
The northern and western parts of the region are the most densely populated of this essentially subsistence agricultural region in which small scale mahangu cultivation and the keeping of cattle form the predominant activities. Although the region depends on rain fed agriculture, other crops can be established under intensive cultivation.

The main settlements in the region straddle the good paved road from the Angolan border to Ondangwa, where it joins the Oshakati-Tsumeb trunk road. The eastern part of the region possesses good grazing land, but the shortage of water and poor communications render it uninhabitable at present. There is a tarred road from Onhuno to Okongo that was recently completed, it is thought to greatly increase the area's agricultural potential.

Ohangwena has 234 schools with a total of 90,703 pupils.

Politics

Constituencies
The region comprises twelve constituencies:
 Eenhana
 Endola
 Engela
 Epembe
 Ohangwena
 Okongo
 Omulonga
 Omundaungilo
 Ondobe
 Ongenga
 Oshikango
 Oshikunde (created in 2013)

Election results
Ohangwena is one of the regions where many Namibian politicians are from, including former President Hifikepunye Pohamba, Hidipo Hamutenya (Founding President of the Rally for Democracy and Progress, RDP), Minister of Environment and Tourism Pohamba Shifeta, former Deputy Minister and Ambassador Hadino Hishongwa, founding member of SWAPO Mzee Kaukungwa and several other ministers and high-profile politicians.

A significant amount of fighting occurred in the region during the Namibian War of Independence. Just as Namibia was set for independence, fighting broke out on April 1, 1989, in the region between People's Liberation Army of Namibia combatants and soldiers in the occupying South African Defence Force. The resulting "9 day war" left many dead.

Ohangwena Region is a SWAPO stronghold. In the 2015 regional elections SWAPO obtained 95% of the total votes (2010: 92%) and won all twelve constituencies with 90% or more. The Rally for Democracy and Progress (RDP) managed to name opposition candidates in all constituencies but one, and the Democratic Turnhalle Alliance (DTA) in two. In the 2020 regional election SWAPO's support dropped slightly to 82% of the total votes. It still won all constituencies by a large margin.

Governors
 Billy Mwaningange
 Usko Nghaamwa (2005–2020)
 Walde Ndevashiya (2020–present)

Demographics
According to the Namibia 2001 Population and Housing Census, Ohangwena had a population of 228,384 (124,823 females and 103,556 males or 83 males for every 100 females) growing at an annual rate of 2.4%.  The fertility rate was 5.3 children per woman.  1% lived in urban areas while 99% lived in rural areas, and with an area of 10,703 km2, the population density was 21.3 persons per km2.  By age, 15% of the population was under 5 years old, 33% between 5–14 years, 41% between 15 and 59 years, and 9% 60 years and older.  The population was divided into 35,958 households, with an average size of 6.3 persons.  60% of households had a female head of house, while 40% had a male.  For those 15 years and older, 59% had never married, 17% married with certificate, 9% married traditionally, 4% married consensually, 4% were divorced or separated, and 6% were widowed.

The most commonly spoken languages at home were Oshiwambo languages, spoken in 97% of households.  For those 15 years and older, the literacy rate was 79%.  In terms of education, 53% of girls and 47% of boys between the ages of 6-15 were attending school, and of those 15 years and older, 51% had left school, 23% were currently at school, and 23% had never attended.

In 2001 the employment rate for the labor force (43% of those 15+) was 64% employed and 36% unemployed.  For those 15+ years old and not in the labor force (53%), 35% were students, 41% homemakers, and 24% retired, too old, etc. According to the 2012 Namibia Labour Force Survey, unemployment in the Ohangwena Region stood at 34.6%. The two studies are methodologically not comparable.

Among households, 78% had access to safe water but only 11% to improved sanitation (toilet facilities). 4% of the households have electricity for lighting, 72% access to radio, and 94% had wood or charcoal for cooking.  In terms of households' main sources of income, 52% derived it from farming, 13% from wages and salaries, 5% cash remittances, 8% from business or non-farming, and 20% from pension.

For every 1000 live births there were 56 female infant deaths and 56 male.  The life expectancy at birth was 45 years for females and 43 for males.  Among children younger than 15, 5% had lost a mother, 11% a father, and 2% were orphaned by both parents.  5% of the entire population had a disability, of which 22% were deaf, 32% blind, 11% had a speech disability, 15% hand disability, 26% leg disability, and 5% mental disability.

Villages
Eehongo
Okahenge
The village hosts about 10,000 inhabitants. There is a clinic, a church, community hall, sub-police station and three schools: Ongenga Primary School, Ongenga Junior School and Ongenga English Private School. Entrepreneurs established businesses such as salons, lodges, tailoring, Omahangu pounding machines and China shops.
The village is headed by mr David Kasheshe. It has one combined school known as Onamahoka Combined School ruled by Ms Hambeleleni Shikulo and it also has multiples of pre-primary schools such as Okasheshe Kindergarten.
Omukukutu is a village in Epembe Constituency, located some 12 km from the main tar road from Eenhana to Okongo along a two-track gravel road with relatively thick sand. The distance from Eenhana to the turnoff from the main tar road is just under 40 km.
Omundaungilo is a settlement area, not officially proclaimed, but regarded as the de facto capital of Omundaungilo Constituency. Omundaungilo is located about 15 km north of the main tar road from Eenhana to Okongo; the turnoff is about 40 km east of Eenhana. The San community lived on the outskirts of the settlement in an area called Omiishi in Oshikwanyama and N!u10 in the local !Xun dialect.
Onane, a village in Okongo Constituency, is located about 12 km from the main tar road from Okongo to the Okongo Community Forest and Conservancy and on to Rundu. Onane is reached via a two-track gravel/sand road (primarily gravel, with relatively thick sand in parts). The distance along the tar road from Okongo to the turnoff to Onane village is approximately 30 km.
Ouholamo is a neighbourhood of the town of Eenhana. Located on the eastern outskirts of the town, Ouholamo is reached via a small sandy track through the bush.
Ouhongo village in Engela constituency, is locacated on the western outskirts of Helao Nafidi town council from Engela. It shares its borders with Engela, Omatunda, Onghala and Onambango.

References

External links

 
Regions of Namibia
States and territories established in 1992
1992 establishments in Namibia